The 1950–51 DDR-Oberliga was the second season of the DDR-Oberliga, the first tier of league football in East Germany. 

The league was contested by 18 teams and BSG Chemie Leipzig won the championship after a championship play-off with BSG Turbine Erfurt because the two teams finished on equal points. It was Chemie Leipzig's first-ever East German championship, with the club winning a second one in 1963–64.

Johannes Schöne of BSG Rotation Babelsberg was the league's top scorer with 37 goals, the highest total of any DDR-Oberliga top scorer throughout the history of the league. The 1950–51 season also saw the highest-ever goal average for the league with 3,85 goals scored per game. While the total goals scored was second only to the following season, 1,178 compare to 1,233, the 1951–52 season had 19 instead of 18 clubs in the league and therefore 36 extra season games.

Table

The 1950–51 season saw SG Volkspolizei Dresden take the place of SG Friedrichstadt while SG Union Oberschöneweide, VfB Pankow and SG Lichtenberg 47 moved across from the Stadtliga Berlin and BSG Rotation Dresden, BSG Stahl Thale and BSG Turbine Weimar were promoted from the second level. Originally four clubs were scheduled to be relegated but the two East Berlin clubs SG Union Oberschöneweide and VfB Pankow were allowed to remain in the league for the following season.

Results

Name changes
Compared to the previous season all eleven clubs that had retained their league place changed their name during the off-season and in the season.

References

Sources

External links
 Das Deutsche Fussball Archiv  Historic German league tables

1950-51
Ober
1950–51 in East German football